Harry T. Crawford, Jr. (born April 17, 1952), is an American Democratic politician from the U.S. state of Alaska.

A native of Shreveport, Louisiana, Crawford moved to Alaska in 1975 to help construct the Alaska Pipeline as an ironworker.

Along with Eric Croft and David Guttenberg, Crawford sponsored two successful ballot initiatives which passed by wide margins: the Alaska Replacement of U.S. Senators Initiative of 2004, which ensured voters would fill any future Senate vacancies, and the Alaska Campaign Finance Reform Initiative of 2006, which reduced the amount any individual or group could give to a candidate or a political party.

Crawford served as a member of the Alaska House of Representatives from 2001 to 2011—in District 22 from 2001 to 2003, then (after districts were renumbered in redistricting) in District 21 for eight years. In 2000, in his second attempt for the seat, he defeated incumbent Ramona Barnes, who had been the first female Speaker of the House, and was previously defeated for renomination to her House seat in 1984 before regaining it two years later.

In 2010, Crawford ran for Alaska's single at-large seat in the United States House of Representatives. He lost to Republican incumbent Don Young by a landslide. Crawford ran for the state House of Representatives in District 27 in 2016, however he was defeated by incumbent Lance Pruitt.

See also

 United States House of Representatives election in Alaska, 2010

References

External links
 Representative Harry Crawford official Alaska Legislature site
 Harry Crawford for State House official campaign site
 
 Campaign contributions at OpenSecrets.org
 Profile at Alaska's House of Representatives Democratic Caucus
 Harry Crawford at 100 Years of Alaska's Legislature

1952 births
Ironworkers
Living people
Democratic Party members of the Alaska House of Representatives
Politicians from Anchorage, Alaska
Politicians from Shreveport, Louisiana
21st-century American politicians